Brad White (born 15 May 1970) is a South African former first-class cricketer. He is now an umpire and has stood in matches in the 2015–16 Ram Slam T20 Challenge. In November 2018, he was part of an umpire exchange programme in India, and stood in the 2018–19 Ranji Trophy match between Tamil Nadu and Bengal. He is part of Cricket South Africa's umpire panel for first-class matches. In January 2022, in the 2021–22 CSA 4-Day Series, White stood in his 150th first-class match as an on-field umpire.

References

External links
 

1970 births
Living people
South African cricketers
South African cricket umpires
Border cricketers
Easterns cricketers
Gauteng cricketers
Cricketers from Port Elizabeth